Montague Turner (21 September 1843 – 25 January 1908) was an English first-class cricketer active 1863–78 who played for Middlesex. He was born in Acton; died in Cuckfield.

References

1843 births
1908 deaths
English cricketers
Middlesex cricketers
Gentlemen of England cricketers
Gentlemen of the South cricketers
Gentlemen cricketers
Gentlemen of Marylebone Cricket Club cricketers